Ole Magnus Bakken (born 28 April 1988, Hamar)  is a Norwegian sport shooter. He competed at the 2012 Summer Olympics in the Men's 10 metre air rifle and 50 m rifle prone.

References

Norwegian male sport shooters
1988 births
Living people
Olympic shooters of Norway
Shooters at the 2012 Summer Olympics
European Games competitors for Norway
Shooters at the 2015 European Games

Sportspeople from Hamar
21st-century Norwegian people